Pearlie Evans (died November 18, 2016 at age 84) was a political strategist and civil rights activist in St. Louis, Missouri. She headed Congressman Bill Clay’s district office. She is profiled in Lift Every Voice and Sing.

She lived in North St. Louis. 

She graduated from the George Warren Brown School of Social Work at Washington University in St. Louis.

References

Year of birth missing
2016 deaths
George Warren Brown School of Social Work alumni
Activists from St. Louis
American civil rights activists